Nicholas Hilmy Kyrgios (born 27 April 1995) is an Australian professional tennis player. In singles, Kyrgios' career-high ATP singles ranking of world No. 13 was achieved on 24 October 2016. He has won seven ATP Tour singles titles, including the 2019 and 2022 Washington Open, and reached eleven finals, most notably a major final at the 2022 Wimbledon Championships, and a Masters 1000 final at the 2017 Cincinnati Masters. In doubles, during his professional career, Kyrgios has a career-high ranking of world No. 11, achieved on 7 November 2022, winning a major doubles title at the 2022 Australian Open and reaching the semifinals of the Miami Open, both times partnering Thanasi Kokkinakis. In singles, he reached a major final at the 2022 Wimbledon Championships and three major quarterfinals (at 2014 Wimbledon, upsetting then-world No. 1 Rafael Nadal en route, the 2015 Australian Open and the 2022 US Open, upsetting then-world No. 1 Daniil Medvedev en route).

Kyrgios is only the third player, after Dominik Hrbatý and Lleyton Hewitt, to have beaten each one of the Big Three (Novak Djokovic, Roger Federer, and Rafael Nadal) the first time he played against them. Although Kyrgios has received praise for his perceived entertaining style of play, he is a controversial player whose matches have featured "epic displays of ranting, racquet-wrecking, and trash-talking". According to Tennishead magazine, he has received more fines for his temperamental on-court behaviour than any other player in ATP history. His actions have included swearing and smashing his racquet, as well as insults and verbal altercations with the crowd, with umpires, with his opponents and with his supporters. In his junior career, Kyrgios won the singles event at the 2013 Australian Open and the doubles events at the 2012 French Open, 2012 Wimbledon Championships and 2013 Wimbledon Championships.

Early life and family
Kyrgios was born on 27 April 1995 in Canberra, Australia, to a father of Greek origin, George, and a Malay mother, Norlaila ("Nill"). His father is a self-employed house painter, and his mother is a computer engineer. His mother was born in Malaysia as a member of the Selangor royal family, but she dropped her title as a princess when she moved to Australia in her twenties. His older sister Halimah works in dance and musical theatre and as a voice and performance coach based in Hong Kong.

Kyrgios attended Radford College until Year 8 and completed his Year 12 certificate in 2012 at Daramalan College in Canberra. He also played basketball in his early teens before deciding to focus solely on tennis when he was 14 years old. Two years later he received a full scholarship at the Australian Institute of Sport, where he was able to further develop his tennis. In 2013, Kyrgios relocated his training base from Canberra to Melbourne Park in an attempt to further his career with better facilities and hitting partners. A year later, Tennis ACT announced a $27 million redevelopment of the Lyneham Tennis Centre in Canberra to lure Kyrgios back home and host Davis Cup and Fed Cup ties. Kyrgios confirmed in January 2015 that he would return home and base himself in Canberra. He also donated $10,000 towards the Lyneham Tennis Centre redevelopment.

Junior career
Kyrgios played his first junior match in 2008 at the age of 13 at a grade 4 tournament in Australia. He won his first ITF junior tour title in Fiji in June 2010, aged 15. He started to compete more regularly on the junior tour in 2011, making his junior grand slam debut at the 2011 Australian Open. During 2012 he won two junior grand slam doubles titles and rose to junior world number three, though he withdrew from the Australian Open Men's Wildcard Playoff due to injury. Moving into 2013, he gained the number 1 junior ranking by defeating Wayne Montgomery in the Traralgon International final. A week later he entered the Australian Open as the juniors number 3 seed and progressed to the final against fellow Australian Thanasi Kokkinakis. After saving two set points in the first set, Kyrgios won his first and only junior grand slam title. He also won Wimbledon junior doubles with Kokkinakis.

Professional career

2012–2013: Turning pro
In 2012, in his first-round qualifying match at the Australian Open, Kyrgios won the first set in a tiebreak, but his opponent Mathieu Rodrigues cruised through the second and third sets to defeat him. Kyrgios then competed on the 2012 ITF Men's Circuit for the rest of the season, competing in tournaments in Australia, Germany, Japan and Slovenia. At the end of the season, he had reached a semifinal and a quarterfinal in Australian tournaments. He finished the year ranked No. 838.

In 2013, he started the season by playing at the 2013 Brisbane International, losing in the first round of qualifying to James Duckworth. He then lost in the first round of qualifying at the 2013 Australian Open to Bradley Klahn in straight sets. After winning the Boys' Singles, Kyrgios said his goal was to reach the top 300 by the end of the year.

At the 2013 Nature's Way Sydney Tennis International, he defeated fellow Australian Matt Reid in straight sets in the finals to win his first challenger tour title at the age of 17.

Kyrgios was given a wildcard into the qualifying competition of the 2013 French Open, but on 20 May it was announced that John Millman was withdrawing from the main draw due to injury; such that, Kyrgios' wildcard was raised to the main draw. This meant he would compete in a main draw of a Grand Slam tournament for the first time. In the first round Kyrgios had the biggest win of his career to date against the former world No. 8 Radek Štěpánek in three sets, each ending in tiebreaks, giving him the first ATP Tour level win of his career. Although he lost to Marin Čilić in the following round, his ranking rose to No. 213. 

Kyrgios later qualified for the 2013 US Open, where he was beaten by fourth seed David Ferrer in his opening match. He reached a new career high of No. 186 on 9 September 2013. In October, Kyrgios made the semifinal of the 2013 Sacramento Challenger, before falling to Tim Smyczek. He ended the year with a singles ranking of 182.

2014: Wimbledon quarterfinal
At the beginning of the 2014 season, Kyrgios was set to debut at the 2014 Brisbane International as a wildcard, but withdrew due to a shoulder injury. On 8 January, Kyrgios was awarded a wildcard into the 2014 Australian Open, where he won his first round match against Benjamin Becker. However, he lost in the second round to Benoît Paire, in five sets.

Kyrgios received a wildcard into the 2014 U.S. National Indoor Tennis Championships, where he lost his first round match to Tim Smyczek in three sets. Kyrgios was then forced to withdraw from numerous ATP tournaments in Delray Beach and Acapulco due to an elbow injury.

At the 2014 Sarasota Open, Kyrgios reached the final by defeating Jarmere Jenkins, Rubén Ramírez Hidalgo, Donald Young and Daniel Kosakowski. He defeated Filip Krajinović in straight sets for his second career challenger title. Following this, Kyrgios defeated Jack Sock to win the 2014 Savannah Challenger. As a wildcard at the 2014 French Open, Kyrgios was defeated in the first round in straight by Milos Raonic. Kyrgios then won his fourth career challenger title at the 2014 Aegon Nottingham Challenge, beating fellow Australian Sam Groth in straight-set tiebreaks.

In June, Kyrgios received a wildcard to the 2014 Wimbledon Championships. After defeating Stéphane Robert in the first round, he went on to beat Richard Gasquet in a five-set second-round thriller; wherein, he lost the first two sets and saved nine match points. In the third round, Kyrgios beat Jiří Veselý, before going on to record the biggest win of his career so far by beating World No. 1 Rafael Nadal in four sets –– becoming the first male debutant to reach the Wimbledon quarterfinals since Florian Mayer, in 2004. The 'shot of the match' was a rear-forehand, half-volley winner from between Kyrgios' legs that David Polkinghorne, of The Canberra Times, called "freakish" and "audacious". Kyrgios subsequently lost to Milos Raonic in four sets in the quarterfinals. This Wimbledon performance helped Kyrgios break into the top 100 of the ATP World Rankings for the first time in his career: i.e. Kyrgios' ranking rose to No. 66.
Post-Wimbledon, at the Rogers Cup tournament in Toronto, Kyrgios earned his first ATP World Tour Masters event win, with a first round victory over Santiago Giraldo in straight sets. However, Kyrgios lost in the second round to Andy Murray, winning just four games. 

In the US Open, Kyrgios made it to the third round, defeating Mikhail Youzhny and Andreas Seppi on his way, before losing to 16th seed Tommy Robredo. Kyrgios later played in the Malaysian Open, but lost in the first round. 

He skipped the rest of the season, citing burnout. He ended the year ranked No. 52 in the world, and the No. 2 ranked Australian behind Lleyton Hewitt.

2015: First final, top 30

Kyrgios started the season off at the Sydney International, but lost his opening match against Jerzy Janowicz in three tightly contested sets. 

During the 2015 Australian Open, Kyrgios received direct entry for the first time due to his ranking. In his opening match, he defeated Federico Delbonis in a five-set thriller, before going on to beat Ivo Karlović and Malek Jaziri in second and third rounds, respectively. He then faced Andreas Seppi, who had just beaten Roger Federer in his previous match, in the fourth round. Kyrgios fell two sets behind and faced down a match point in the fourth set but, recovered to win in five sets. As a result, Kyrgios became the first teenage male to reach two Grand Slam quarterfinals since Federer in 2001, the first Australian male to reach the quarterfinals since Hewitt in 2005, and the first Australian of any gender to reach the quarterfinals since Jelena Dokic in 2009. In the quarterfinals, Kyrgios lost to eventual finalist Andy Murray in straight sets. After the tournament, he reached a career-high ranking of no. 35 in the world. 

He later withdrew from tournaments in Marseille and Dubai due to a back injury he suffered during the Australian Open. In Indian Wells, he served for the match against Grigor Dimitrov, but rolled his ankle and ultimately lost.

Kyrgios returned in the Barcelona Open. After receiving a bye in the first round, he lost in three sets to fellow 19-year-old Elias Ymer.
At the Estoril Open, Kyrgios reached the final of an ATP tournament for the first time in his career, after defeating Albert Ramos Viñolas, Filip Krajinović, Robin Haase and Pablo Carreño Busta. He then lost the final to Richard Gasquet, in straight sets.

At the Madrid Open a week later, Kyrgios defeated world No. 2 and 17-time Grand Slam champion Roger Federer in the second round, after saving two match points in the final set tiebreak. He then had a three-set loss to John Isner in the third round. At this point, until his finalist appearance at Estoril and third round finish in Madrid, Kyrgios had the unique distinction of having won more matches in Grand Slams (10) than on the regular ATP Tour (2).

At the French Open, Kyrgios was seeded 29th, his first Grand Slam seeding. He won in straight sets in the first round against Denis Istomin. He then received a walkover into the third round, after Kyle Edmund withdrew with injury. In the third round, he lost in straight sets to third seed Andy Murray. In the doubles, Kyrgios and partner Mahesh Bhupathi lost in the first round to wildcards Thanasi Kokkinakis and Lucas Pouille.

At the 2015 Wimbledon Championships, Kyrgios opened with straight-set victories over Diego Schwartzman and Juan Mónaco in the first and second rounds, respectively. In the third round, despite losing the first set, he advanced past seventh seed Milos Raonic  ––before losing to Gasquet in the fourth round, squandering set points in the fourth. He also played mixed doubles with Madison Keys, but only reached the second round

During the tournament, he was involved in several controversies, all of which resulted in code violation warnings. During his first round match with Schwartzman, Kyrgios threatened to stop play following a disputed line call. In the following match, a linesman heard him say "dirty scum"; Kyrgios said his words were not directed at the umpire. During his third round match against Raonic he smashed his racket, which bounced into the stands, following a missed break point. Kyrgios fell out of the top 40 in the rankings following the tournament.

2016: Hopman Cup champion, 3 titles, top 15
At the 2016 Hopman Cup, Kygrios partnered with Daria Gavrilova, as part of the Australia Green team. During the round robin, Australia Green won 3–0 against Germany, with Kyrgios winning both his singles match against Alexander Zverev andmixed doubles match with Gavrilova. The Australian Green team next faced off against Great Britain; where Kyrgios recorded his first-ever win over Andy Murray (in straight sets) and also won the doubles, claiming a 2–1 win over the British team. Following this, he went on to win the Hopman Cup alongside Gavrilova, defeating Ukraine in the final –– marking Kyrgios' first title on the World Tour.

At the 2016 Australian Open he claimed straight-set wins over Pablo Carreño Busta and Pablo Cuevas before losing to sixth-ranked Tomáš Berdych in the third round in 4 sets.

Kyrgios won his maiden ATP title at the Open 13 in Marseille by defeating Gasquet in the quarterfinal, Berdych in the semi-final and lastly, Čilić in the final, all in straight sets. Notably, Kyrgios finished the tournament without having his serve broken.

During the Dubai Tennis Championships Kyrgios reached the semifinals, where he retired against Stan Wawrinka. At the 2016 Indian Wells tournament, he lost in the first round to Albert Ramos Viñolas.

At the 2016 Miami Open Kyrgios reached his first ATP World Tour Masters 1000 semifinal, with straight-set wins over Marcos Baghdati, Tim Smyczek, Andrey Kuznetsov and Milos Raonic –– before losing in the semis to Kei Nishikori. Following Miami Open, Kyrgios entered the top 20 for the first time, becoming the youngest player to do so since Čilić seven years earlier.

At the French Open, Kyrgios entered as the 14th seed and went on to beat Marco Cecchinato and Igor Sijsling, reaching the third round; however, he lost to 9th seed Gasquet. Similarly, at Wimbledon (as the 15th seed), he advanced to the fourth round after defeating Radek Štěpánek, Dustin Brown and Feliciano López  –– losing to eventual champion Murray.

In Atlanta, as the second seed, Kyrgios advanced to the final after defeating wildcard Jared Donaldson, Fernando Verdasco and Yoshihito Nishioka. In the final, Kyrgios faced three-time defending champion Isner and defeated him to win his second ATP title. Kyrgios reached a career-high ranking of No. 16 following the tournament.

At the US Open, Kyrgios reached the third round against Illya Marchenko before retiring with a hip injury that had also affected him in previous rounds. He returned with a straight-set win in his rubber for Australia in the Davis Cup World Group playoff.

In October, after a second-round loss to Kevin Anderson at the 2016 Chengdu Open, Kyrgios bounced back by winning his first ATP World Tour 500 series title in Tokyo, at the 2016 Japan Open Tennis Championships, beating David Goffin.

2017: First Masters final
At the 2017 Australian Open, Kyrgios was seeded 14th. He defeated Gastão Elias before falling to Andreas Seppi in round two, despite leading by two sets to love. At the Mexican Open, Kyrgios defeated Novak Djokovic in straight sets in the quarter-finals. Djokovic managed to win just 20.5% of return points in the match, his lowest ever in a tour match. Kyrgios fell to eventual champion Sam Querrey in 3 sets in the semifinals. Kyrgios defeated Djokovic again in straight sets in the fourth round of the Indian Wells Masters tournament. He then withdrew from his quarterfinal match with Federer due to illness. He moved to Miami, where he beat Goffin and Zverev before losing in the semifinals in three tiebreak sets to Federer in three hours and ten minutes.

Kyrgios then participated in Madrid, where he lost in straight sets in the third round to Nadal. At Roland Garros, Kyrgios lost to Kevin Anderson in the second round after winning the first set. He then withdrew from his first-round matches at Queen's Club, Wimbledon and Washington due to injuries. After his recent slump in form, Kyrgios then reached the third round of the Montreal Masters, where he lost to Zverev in straight sets. In the Cincinnati Masters, Kyrgios made it to the quarterfinals, where he defeated world No. 2 Nadal in straight sets. He followed that up with a victory over Ferrer to reach his first Masters 1000 final, where he lost to Grigor Dimitrov in straight sets. At the China Open, he was crushed by Nadal in the final. Kyrgios's record against Nadal fell to 2–3 with this loss.

In the inaugural 2017 Laver Cup, Kyrgios competed for Team World, replacing Milos Raonic following his withdrawal from the tournament. In doubles, Kyrgios partnered with Jack Sock, defeating Tomas Berdych and Rafael Nadal and earning Team World's only point on Day 1. In singles, Kyrgios defeated Tomáš Berdych, earning Team World's only points on Day 2. Kyrgios went on to play a match tie-break with Roger Federer on Day 3, which would have forced a deciding doubles match. However, Federer defended the match point and went on to win: resulting in an overall victory for Team Europe (15–9).

2018: Clay season absence
In his first tournament of the season at the 2018 Brisbane International, Kyrgios received a bye into the second round due to being the 3rd seed. In his first competitive match since the 2017 European Open, Kyrgios lost the first set to his compatriot Matthew Ebden in a tiebreak but found his form and won in three sets. He reached the final, defeating Ryan Harrison to win his first title since Tokyo 2016. The win returned him to the top 20, at no. 17.

In the third round of the 2018 Australian Open, Kyrgios defeated Jo-Wilfried Tsonga in four sets. He was then beaten by Grigor Dimitrov in tight four setter, with the latter winning three tiebreaks. Kyrgios served 36 aces in that match.

After the Australian Open, Alexander Zverev defeated Kyrgios in four sets at the Davis Cup. It was soon revealed that he was playing with an elbow injury. In light of this, he cancelled appearances at the Delray Beach Open and Indian Wells Masters tournament. He resumed his season at the Miami Open, defeating Dušan Lajović and Fabio Fognini in straight sets before falling to Zverev in straight sets. Kyrgios weathered a lackluster clay season and did not play at the French Open, citing the elbow injury that spoiled the first quarter of 2018.

Kyrgios and Jackson Withrow of the USA were knocked out of the first round doubles match by Sriram Balaji and Vishnu Vardhan. His next tournament, the Stuttgart Open, saw him reach the semifinals, falling to eventual champion Federer. After Stuttgart, Kyrgios entered the Queen's Club Championships. His won his first-round match over former world No. 1 Murray. This was notable as it was Murray's return to the tour since Wimbledon 2017 and Kyrgios's first professional win over Murray after five prior attempts. He was defeated in the semifinals by Čilić in two tiebreaks. At Wimbledon, Kyrgios defeated Istomin and Haase but lost to Nishikori in straight sets in the third round.

His campaign in the 2018 US Open generated controversy. In his second-round match, Kyrgios appeared to be given advice by umpire Mohammed Lahyani that seemed to turn the tide in match against Pierre-Hugues Herbert, which he won. Kyrgios's US Open run ended in the next round with a loss to Federer, who saw him out in straight sets.

At the annual Laver Cup, Kyrgios was defeated by Federer in straight sets. He then won the doubles with Jack Sock against Grigor Dimitrov and David Goffin. At the Shanghai Open, he was accused of tanking by the chair umpire before losing to world No. 104 Bradley Klahn. His last event on the ATP tour was a wildcard draw at the Kremlin Cup. He defeated Andrey Rublev in three sets before withdrawing against his next opponent, Mirza Bašić, citing an elbow injury. He also revealed weeks later that he was seeing psychologists to improve his mental health.

2019: Two titles, a default, and a suspension
Kyrgios began 2019 at the Brisbane International, where, in a rematch of last year's final, he defeated Ryan Harrison in the round of 32. He subsequently lost to Jérémy Chardy. His middling performance in his home country culminated in a straight-sets opening round loss to Milos Raonic at the 2019 Australian Open.

Kyrgios won the 2019 Mexican Open in Acapulco (his fifth title), after beating three top 10 players (i.e. Nadal, Isner and Zverev) and three-time Grand Slam champion Stan Wawrinka, en route. His Miami Open campaign was full of controversy: a victory over Dušan Lajović in the third round involved two successful underarm serves and an altercation with a spectator, and the follow-up loss to Borna Ćorić in the round of 16 involved another argument with a spectator and both players smashing racquets. Following his loss, he acknowledged his opponent's more disciplined nature and questioned his own motivation.

In Rome, Kyrgios beat Daniil Medvedev but then lost his next match to Casper Ruud by default in the third set when he threw a chair on the court after swearing at a linesperson. He forfeited the rankings points and prize money, but no further penalties were imposed. At Wimbledon, Kyrgios defeated compatriot Jordan Thompson in a five-setter, but then lost to Nadal in four sets in the second round.

Kyrgios won his sixth title in Washington beating two top 10 players en route. He overcame first seed Stefanos Tsitsipas in the semi-final in three sets, and third seed Daniil Medvedev in the final in straight sets. At the US Open, Kyrgios progressed to the third round where he lost to Andrey Rublev in straight sets in another controversial match, complaining that he was being blinded by the stadium lights while serving. At the annual Laver Cup, Kyrgios was again defeated by Federer, this time in a closer three-set match with a deciding match tiebreak. He teamed up with Jack Sock once again for the doubles, which they won against Rafael Nadal and Stefanos Tsitsipas.

Following the incident at the 2019 Cincinnati Masters tournament, where Kyrgios was fined $113,000 for five separate incidents of unsportsmanlike conduct, the ATP conducted an investigation into his behaviour. The investigation ended on September 26, and he was issued a 16-week suspended ban, a $25,000 fine, and a six-month probationary period. Although Kyrgios had corrected his comments by saying that "corrupt" was not the right choice of words, the ATP explained that a second investigation had taken place after his comments at the US Open.

2020: Longest career match 
At the 2020 Australian Open, Kyrgios was seeded 23rd. In the first round, he beat Lorenzo Sonego in straight sets before defeating Gilles Simon in four sets in the second round. In the third round, he defeated Karen Khachanov in the longest match of both his career and the 2020 Australian Open, lasting 4 hours and 26 minutes. He then played Rafael Nadal in the fourth round, which he lost in four sets. Kyrgios played alongside Amanda Anisimova in the mixed doubles, where they ended up losing in the second round.

At the 2020 Mexican Open, Kyrgios attempted to defend his 2019 title, but retired from his first round match against Ugo Humbert, due to a wrist injury. Kyrgios withdrew from the 2020 US Open, choosing to avoid taking health risks amid the COVID-19 pandemic. 

Kyrgios ended 2020 with a singles rank of No. 45.

2021: Tournament withdrawals, knee injury
At the 2021 Australian Open, Kyrgios lost in the third round to Dominic Thiem despite at one stage leading by two sets to love.

In April, Kyrgios announced he would play in the Mallorca Open. He followed this by also announcing that he would play in the Stuttgart Open, but withdrew from both tournaments. He entered Wimbledon to continue his return to competitive tennis, and won his opening match against 21st-seeded Ugo Humbert in a five-set match that stretched out over two days. In the second round Kyrgios beat Gianluca Mager in straight sets. In the third round against Félix Auger-Aliassime, with the match tied at one set each, he retired after the second set due to an abdominal injury.

Kyrgios failed to defend his title in Washington, losing in the first round to Mackenzie McDonald in straight sets. At the US Open, he lost in the first round to Roberto Bautista Agut in straight sets.

Kyrgios then competed for Team World at the Laver Cup for the fourth consecutive year. He lost his singles match to Stefanos Tsitsipas and partnered John Isner in doubles, where they lost to Tsitsipas and Andrey Rublev. After the conclusion of the Laver Cup, on 28 September 2021, Kyrgios announced he was ending his 2021 season due to a knee injury. 

He ended 2021 with a singles ranking of 93.

2022: Wimbledon final, Australian Open doubles title, ATP Finals and return to Top 20 

Kyrgios withdrew from the Melbourne Summer Set ATP 250 tournament after feeling run down for four days due to asthma. On January 10, he tested positive for COVID-19 and had also to withdraw from the Sydney Tennis Classic. As a result, he dropped to No. 114 on the ATP rankings, the first time he had been out of the top 100 since June 2014.

At the 2022 Australian Open, he won his first round match in straight sets against qualifier Liam Broady. He was subsequently defeated in the second round by top seed Daniil Medvedev over four sets. In doubles, Kyrgios partnered with Thanasi Kokkinakis to defeat the world No. 1 doubles team, Nikola Mektić and Mate Pavić, en route to the quarter-finals. Following their success in the quarter-finals and semi-finals, this set up the first all-Australian doubles final (since 1980) against Matthew Ebden and Max Purcell. Kyrgios and Kokkinakis won in straight sets, becoming the first all-Australian men's doubles champions (at the Australian Open) since The Woodies in 1997. Moreover, Kyrgios and Kokkinakis are the first wildcard pairing in the Open era to win the Australian Open men's doubles title. As a result, Kyrgios moved to the top 40 in the doubles rankings on 31 January 2022, rising 219 spots.

Kyrgios next received a wildcard into the main draw at Indian Wells, California. He beat Sebastián Báez and Federico Delbonis, in straight sets, to get to the third round; where he then beat world No. 8 Casper Ruud. He received a walkover in the fourth round following the withdrawal of Jannik Sinner, but then lost in 3 sets to Rafael Nadal in the quarterfinals. He had less success in doubles (partnered Kokkinakis), as the pair lost in the second round to eventual champions John Isner and Jack Sock.

In Miami, he advanced to the fourth round, but was beaten in straight sets by Jannik Sinner. In doubles, Kyrgios and Kokkinakis finished up in the semifinals, again losing to the eventual champions Isner and Hubert Hurkacz. Kyrgios then reached the semifinals in Houston, his sole clay court event of the year, losing to Reilly Opelka in the semifinals. In Stuttgart, his first grass tournament of the year, Kyrgios reached the semi-finals where he lost to Andy Murray. In Halle, Kyrgios beat second seed and world No. 6 Stefanos Tsitsipas and sixth seed Pablo Carreno Busta on his way to his third tour-level semifinal of 2022, before losing to Hubert Hurkacz.

At the 2022 Wimbledon Championships, Kyrgios beat wildcard Paul Jubb in 5 sets, but was fined US$10,000 for verbally abusing a line judge and spitting in the direction of a spectator. He then went on to beat Filip Krajinović and Tsitsipas (for the second time during the grass season), to reach the fourth round. Following this, Kyrgios beat Brandon Nakashima to reach his first major quarterfinal since the 2015 Australian Open. He followed this with a shut out win over Cristian Garín and reached his first ever Major semifinal. Kyrgios then reached his first major final after Rafael Nadal withdrew from the semifinals, becoming the first player in the Open Era to get a walkover into the Wimbledon final. Kyrgios lost the Wimbledon final to Novak Djokovic in a competitive match lasting over three hours.

In Atlanta, Kyrgios withdrew from the singles tournament, but went on to win his second doubles title with Kokkinakis, defeating fellow Australians Jason Kubler and John Peers in straight sets. In Washington, Kyrgios won his first singles title in 3 years and his second Washington Open singles title –– defeating Marcos Giron, Tommy Paul, Reilly Opelka, Frances Tiafoe and Mikael Ymer en route to the final against Yoshihito Nishioka, where he won in straight sets. In the doubles, Kyrgios partnered with Jack Sock, where after receiving a walkover in the semifinals, they defeated Ivan Dodig and Austin Krajicek to win the Washington Open doubles title. As a result, Kyrgios became the first player to win both the singles and doubles titles at Washington in the same year in the tournament's history. 

At the Canadian Open, Kyrgios defeated top seed Daniil Medvedev in the second round. Next he defeated his compatriot Alex de Minaur but eventually lost to Hubert Hurkacz in the quarterfinals. At the Cincinnati Masters, Kyrgios was defeated in the second round by Taylor Fritz in a match only lasting 51 minutes.

At the US Open, Kyrgios defeated Thanasi Kokkinakis, Benjamin Bonzi and wildcard JJ Wolf to reach the fourth round at the US Open for the first time in his career. He then defeated world No.1 Danill Medvedev in four sets to reach the quarterfinals at the event for the first time. With his win over Medvedev, Kyrgios became the first player to beat the world No. 1 twice within the same year, since Pat Cash in 1987. In the quarterfinals, he faced off against Russian 27th seed Karen Khachanov, losing a closely fought match in five sets. Despite the loss, Kyrgios returned to the Top 20 for the first time since February 2020 and reclaimed the No.1 Australian position, overtaking Alex De Minaur.

In October, Kyrgios reached the quarterfinals of the Japan Open, but withdrew before his clash with Taylor Fritz, citing a knee problem as the cause for his exit.

Kyrgios, along with doubles partner Thanasi Kokkinakis qualified for the 2022 ATP Finals in Turin after being guaranteed a spot under the Grand Slam champion provision. The pair failed to progress past the round robin stage of the event after recording a 1-2 win-loss record.

Kyrgios ended the season ranked No. 22 in singles and No. 13 in doubles. This was Kyrgios' highest end-of-year doubles ranking of his career.

2023: Knee injury and Australian Open withdrawal 
Kyrgios was scheduled to participate in the inaugural United Cup to begin his season, representing Australia, however withdrew on the eve of the event following an ankle injury. Kyrgios subsequently withdrew from the Adelaide International 2 event the following week as a precaution in the lead up to the Australian Open. On 13 January, Kyrgios competed in an exhibition match against Novak Djokovic on Rod Laver Arena in a Fast4 format. Kyrgios defeated Djokovic in three-sets in front of a sold-out crowd. Just days later, on the eve of the 2023 Australian Open, Kyrgios withdrew from the event due to a knee injury. He revealed a cyst caused by a tear in his lateral meniscus will require arthroscopic surgery.

National representation

ATP Cup 
Kyrgios played in the inaugural ATP Cup in 2020 in Brisbane and in the Sydney finals. He won three straight singles matches against Jan-Lennard Struff of Germany, Stefanos Tsitsipas of Greece and Cameron Norrie of Great Britain respectively, as well as a doubles match alongside Alex de Minaur to defeat Great Britain in the quarter-finals. He eventually lost to Roberto Bautista Agut in the semi-finals against Spain in straight sets.

Davis Cup
Kyrgios made his Davis Cup debut for Australia in September 2013 against Poland at the age of 18. He replaced Marinko Matosevic after defeating him in a playoff during the lead-up to the tie. He was selected to pair with Chris Guccione in the crucial doubles rubber. They lost to Mariusz Fyrstenberg and Marcin Matkowski in five sets. He then went on to win his first singles rubber, after Michał Przysiężny retired five games into the match.

After the media attention he attracted during Wimbledon 2015, Kyrgios lost the second rubber of the quarter-final tie against Kazakhstan. His most publicised quote during this match was his comment "I don't want to be here". Kyrgios was then replaced by Sam Groth in the reverse singles rubber. He was dumped from the Davis Cup squad due to play their semi-final tie against Great Britain. He returned to the Davis Cup team in September 2016 for Australia's emphatic World Group playoff victory against Slovakia.

In 2019, Kyrgios was left out of the Davis Cup team for their qualifier in Adelaide, which they won against Bosnia and Herzegovina. He was re-added to the team later in the year for the Davis Cup Finals in Spain. In Spain, he won his singles rubbers against Colombia and Belgium to advance to the quarter-finals against Canada. He then withdrew from the quarter-finals due to injury and was replaced by John Millman in his singles rubber, which he lost. Australia ended up losing the tie 1–2.

Olympics
Kyrgios qualified for his first Olympics at Rio 2016 but withdrew from the event due to differences with the Australian Olympic Committee. Kyrgios said in July 2021 that he would not compete in the Tokyo 2020 Olympic Games.

Style of play

Kyrgios has been described as having an unusually aggressive game. While growing up, he was overweight, asthmatic, and has stated he “had to work out a way to be more aggressive than the average player”. Former British no. 1 John Lloyd described watching Kyrgios as a "pleasure" because of "the mixture and the flair", adding that his character is one which attracts fans. The Guardian has described his playing style as "powerfully flamboyant, sometimes ridiculously-brilliant game, which is something to behold".

In 2017, the ATP rated Kygrios as the fifth best server in the history of professional tennis – with better results than current players such as Novak Djokovic and Roger Federer. His second serve is also one of the best on the ATP Tour and often hit at above . He sometimes tries for aces, on both his first and second serves. Goran Ivanišević has said “[Kygrios] is a tennis genius. You can’t prepare for Nick Kygrios, he is the best server in the game by far. It’s impossible to create tactics [against him].”He has an effective forehand and (two-handed) backhand and is also able to mix up his shot selection using spin, slices and dropshots. While his game suits grass and hard courts, he reached his first ATP Tour final on clay in Estoril.

Underarm serve
Kyrgios first used the underarm serve at the 2019 Mexican Open during his match with Rafael Nadal, who subsequently claimed it was not within the spirit of the game, and accused Kyrgios of "lacking respect" for his opponent and the crowd. 

Kyrgios has been credited for reintroducing the underarm serve into the ATP Tour, and he has now used the underarm serve more frequently than any other player in professional tennis.

Coaching history
Kyrgios has had a number of different coaches and mentors throughout his career. He tends to try one coach and then another, but prefers to do things his own way. In an interview with The New Yorker in 2017, he said: “Every coach I had tried to tame me, tried to make me play more disciplined, tried to make me do drills. I’ve just been kind of playing on instinct. I feel like it’s been successful, so I don’t know why there’s a good reason to stop that.”

In his junior and early professional career, Kyrgios was coached by former Australian professional tennis player and then-ACT national academy coach Todd Larkham, who was Kyrgios' first coach. Larkham had coached Kyrgios from age 10–17. In 2013 it was reported that he was coached by former Australian professional tennis player Desmond Tyson, and later New Zealand tennis coach Simon Rea who worked for Tennis Australia. Under Rea Kyrgios reached a Grand Slam Quarter-final (Wimbledon) for the first time in his career. In 2014 Kyrgios was re-united with former coach Todd Larkham alongside former Australian professional doubles player Joshua Eagle. Kyrgios' cited reasons to change coaches were to spend more time at his home in Canberra. In June 2015 Kyrgios parted with Larkham, less than a week before his appearance at Wimbledon. Two months later, in the lead-up to the US Open, Kyrgios brought in Lleyton Hewitt for temporary coaching and mentoring.

Kyrgios continued not having a coach for the remainder of 2015 and throughout 2016. In May 2017, almost two years without a coach, Kyrgios hired French former professional tennis player Sébastien Grosjean. Grosjean was allegedly hired on a part-time basis, and held the position until the end of the year. Since 2017 Kyrgios has been without a head coach, and in 2020 stated: “And, for me, I don't have a goal of winning grand slams. I just want to do it my way, have fun with it and just play. So to get a coach for me is just pointless. Because I don't want to waste their time almost. I just don't think a coach is ready – and I'm not going to put them through it too cause it would just be a nightmare. Where I'm at my career now, it's just too far gone, I think for a coach, 'cause I'm too set in my ways and I just don't like to listen to advice, to be honest.”

Throughout his career Kyrgios has had offers by many former professional players, and coaches, to coach him. Some include Jimmy Connors (2016), Pete Sampras (2016) and John McEnroe (2017, 2020).

Reputation

Early career 
Kyrgios won his first challenger tour title at the age of 17. His childhood coach, Andrew Bulley, said he was a "super competitor" who "trained with a better intensity than the other kids. He always turned up and gave it 100 per cent." His parents used to take him to every regional competition in Australia they could enlist him in. As an 18 year old, his father George Kyrgios, said: "As a junior he was always playing older kids and you could just see him adjusting. He's a perfectionist and has been pretty hard on himself along the way." Top French player, Richard Gasquet, beat the 18 year old Kyrgios in the 2014 Davis Cup World Group tie and said afterwards: He's got a great attitude and a wonderful personality. I think he will be a prominent player in the future.

Andrew Bulley believes the support of Kyrgios' close knit family was a critical factor in his attitude and motivation at the time. He was close to his family and friends, but as he rose through the rankings, playing in tournaments all over the world meant that he was away from home for long periods. He said: “I was winning, losing, going through relationship problems, dealing with other problems and I was pushing (family) away because you feel like the world’s against you. I’m going seven months a year abroad in a new place every week. That’s why tennis is so hard in my opinion." According to his mother, Nill Kyrgios, this was a very hard time for her son as a result of the criticism and pressure he was under.

Current public perception 
Kyrgios is now known as a talented but mercurial and hot-tempered player. He has been accused of tanking, verbal abuse, and unsportsmanlike conduct by umpires, match referees, the media and by former tennis players, including John McEnroe. In 2019, the Associated Press described Kyrgios as "a volatile sort who has repeatedly got in trouble for on-court actions". He is also known for his authenticity and individuality, and has been described by three-time Wimbledon champion John Newcombe as an "exceptional talent" and "a real individual".

Kyrgios has openly said that he "does not love tennis" and has a greater interest in basketball. He openly critiqued his dedication to the sport after his exit at the 2017 US Open to fellow Australian John Millman, saying that he is "not dedicated to the game at all" and "There are players out there that are more dedicated, that want to get better, that strive to get better every day, the one-percenters. I'm not that guy."
At the 2015 Wimbledon Championships, after he failed to return numerous serves, Kyrgios was accused of tanking—deliberately not playing up to his abilities—during the second set of his fourth-round loss to Gasquet. Kyrgios was booed by the crowd for his perceived lack of effort, but denied the accusations, stating "of course I tried".

In October 2016 Kyrgios was fined $32,900 (on top of an earlier fine of $21,659—$13,127 for lack of effort, $6,563 for verbal abuse of a spectator, and $1,969 for unsportsmanlike conduct) and banned for eight weeks for "lack of best efforts" against unseeded Mischa Zverev in the second round of the Shanghai Rolex Masters. He threw the match 6–3, 6–1, in 48 minutes, at one point asking the umpire: "Can you call time so I can finish this match and go home?" When later asked during a press conference if he thought he owed the fans a better effort, he responded: "What does that even mean? I'm good at hitting a tennis ball at the net. Big deal. I don't owe them anything. If you don't like it, I didn't ask you to come watch. Just leave."

Some commentators believe Kyrgios is more committed than he claims. After a string of successes in 2017, Kyrgios attributed his greater consistency that year to an improved work ethic. He said: "I've made an effort to try and put in the work every day. It hasn't been easy." However, he continues to cause controversy on the court. Hugh van Cuylenburg, founder of the Resilience Project in Australia says Kyrgios is deliberately provocative and thrives when there is chaos around him: “Some people thrive in a hostile environment because it tricks them into the right level of arousal and reminds them of how much they care and how much they want to win – and Kyrgios is one of those.”

Kyrgios produced some of the best performances of his career at Wimbledon in 2022. After losing to Djokovic in the final, Kyrgios said: “It’s taken me 10 years – almost 10 years – in my career to finally get to the point of playing for a grand slam and coming up short, but my level is right there." When asked if this had made him hungry for more grand slam finals, he replied "no, it was exhausting!", provoking laughter among the crowds.

Opinions on Kyrgios held by other tennis professionals

Players, coaches and commentators 
John Newcombe, former Australian world No. 1 in both singles and doubles, remarked that: "Nick is an exceptional talent and he doesn't beat to the same drum as everyone else – he's a real individual."

Tim Henman, former British No.1 (1996, 1999–2005) prior to Andy Murray, stated that: "Kyrgios is a performer, an entertainer and will go out and play the tennis he is capable of. He can beat anyone because he is seriously talented. He is a bit different and speaks his mind."

Paul Annacone, Roger Federer's former coach, has been quoted as saying: "I think Nick is the most talented player since Roger jumped on the scene”.

Novak Djokovic after beating Kyrgios in the 2022 Wimbledon final: "I really respect you a lot. I think you are a phenomenal tennis player and athlete, an amazing talent."

Coco Gauff, during a press-conference at Flushing Meadows, praised Kyrgios for practicing with her at the Miami Open despite already having concluded a two-hour long practice with Frances Tiafoe, noting that:“I know there's things on the court that he does that people don't agree with. I probably don't agree with some things,” Gauff said. “But it's just things like [hitting with a young kid] that stands out for me."

"It's just moments like that that people don't really see about him. So I think people paint him as a bad guy. I feel around the grounds, at least my experience of him, he's not."

"If he keeps it up, I think he can go far ... I always, always root for him, no matter who he's playing, to be honest."

John McEnroe 
John McEnroe has also praised Kyrgios's talent. In late 2018 on the Seven Network's Sunday Night show in Australia, McEnroe said that Kyrgios is "the most talented player [he's] seen in the last ten years" but that Kyrgios may "run himself out", if he continued not to commit himself to tennis. While hosting a radio call-in show during the 2021 Wimbledon Championships on BBC Radio 5 Live McEnroe stated that if he could choose any player on the current tour to coach he would pick Kyrgios.

However, McEnroe has also criticised Kyrgios's behaviour several times. Following his loss to Murray at the 2016 Wimbledon championships, McEnroe criticised his temperament, saying: "Kyrgios has to look in the mirror if he wants to become a top player and win Slams." He questioned his attitude towards the sport as Kyrgios was reportedly seen watching compatriot Hewitt in a doubles match shortly before his match with Murray.

Two months later and following his exit from the US Open, Kyrgios was further criticised by McEnroe. He called on Kyrgios to retire from the sport, saying: "Nick Kyrgios, if you don't want to be a professional tennis player, do something else." The comments came shortly after his third round defeat by Illya Marchenko, in which he retired due to a hip injury. McEnroe commented: "He's hurt because he's not training enough."

Off the court

Persona outside professional tennis 
Those who know Kyrgios personally say his off-court personality is very different from his on-court antics. Hugh van Cuylenburg, founder of the Resilience Project says: “Everyone who has ever met him say he’s a sensational person who cares deeply about other people. He doesn’t seek recognition or publicity for the good things he does."On a similar note, fellow Australian, Jason Kubler, said:“Every time I see him, he’s smiling. Every time I’m around him, it seems like I’m laughing. So it’s kind of weird when I read or see the comments about him, knowing him the way I do. He's just one of those people if you were to hang around him or spend any sort of quality time with him, you’d fall in love with him.”

Response to Australian bushfires
Kyrgios pledged to donate $200 for every ace he served during the summer, which was subsequently taken up by other Australian tennis players. Kyrgios also asked Tennis Australia to hold an exhibition match before the 2020 Australian Open to raise more funds. Numerous top tennis players participated including Caroline Wozniacki, Serena Williams, Coco Gauff, Alexander Zverev, Stefanos Tsitsipas, Naomi Osaka, Dominic Thiem, Petra Kvitova, Novak Djokovic, Rafael Nadal and Roger Federer. This brought the Aces for Bushfire Relief total to almost $5 million.

Criticism and support for Djokovic 
In June 2020, Kyrgios publicly criticized Djokovic for organizing the controversial charity tennis tournament at which Djokovic and numerous other tennis players tested positive for Covid-19, calling it a "boneheaded decision". 

In January 2021, Kyrgios called Djokovic a "tool" after he issued a wish-list of requirements for players forced to quarantine when they arrive in the country to play in the Australian Open. A year later, when Djokovic was detained by the Australian government after entering the country unvaccinated, Kyrgios spoke up for him, declaring: “He’s a human, I just don’t think how we’re going about it is the right way and that’s coming from someone who we’ve had run in and comments about each other, but it’s not right.”  He also praised Djokovic for his generous response to the bush fire disasters.

In June 2022, after Djokovic beat Kyrgios in the Wimbledon final, Kyrgios called Djokovic "a bit of a god" after which Djokovic jokingly declared his relationship with Nick Kyrgios "officially a bromance".

Controversial incidents 
Kyrgios has been involved in numerous controversial incidents during tennis matches, including occasions when he has made disrespectful comments to, or about, his opponent, the umpire, the lines judges, ball boys/girls and members of the audience.

During a match at the 2015 Rogers Cup, Kyrgios generated considerable controversy for insults he directed at Stan Wawrinka in the middle of the match. Kyrgios, speaking aloud but not directly to Wawrinka, said: "Kokkinakis banged your girlfriend. Sorry to tell you that, mate". Microphones also picked up Kyrgios saying under his breath that Wawrinka, 30 at the time, was "banging 18-year-olds". After the match, Wawrinka said he found the comments "unacceptable" and urged action be taken against Kyrgios.

Kyrgios was fined $13,127 and given suspended penalties of $32,818 and a 28-day ban, pending further breaches by the ATP. He claimed he later apologised to Wawrinka though Wawrinka denied this claim. Kyrgios's mother shut down her Twitter account several hours after this incident after personal criticisms were levelled at her. She indicated that her son's insults had been made in retaliation, and that Wawrinka accused her son of "faking an injury" during a previous match between the two.

Following a review, the ATP handed down a 28-day suspended sentence, to expire after six months. Kyrgios would also have received a $25,000 fine had he incurred a further fine for "verbal or physical abuse" during that six-month period. At the same tournament he received a $3,281 fine for unsportsmanlike conduct for a comment he made to a ball person.

Kyrgios has also been warned and fined for various other instances of inappropriate behaviour. He was given three code violations for audible obscenities and racket-smashing at the 2014 US Open (one more would have disqualified him), fined $4,926 for audible obscenities and racket-smashing at the 2015 Australian Open, fined $12,470 for unsportsmanlike conduct and $2,625 for swearing at the 2015 Wimbledon, fined $4,370 for swearing at the 2016 Australian Open (he also took a phone call while on court during a mixed doubles match), fined $6,200 for swearing at the 2016 French Open, and fined $8,690 for swearing at the 2016 Wimbledon.

At the 2018 Queen's Club Championships, Kyrgios was issued a $17,500 fine after "miming masturbation with his water bottle" during a changeover in his semifinal match against Čilić. At the 2019 Rome Masters, Kyrgios was defaulted from his second round encounter with Casper Ruud after swearing at a line judge, kicking a bottle, and hurling a chair onto court. Kyrgios was subsequently fined €20,000 and forfeited all prize money and points earned during the event, and told to cover the costs of his hospitality. In June 2019, Kyrgios was assessed three fines totaling $17,500 for unsportsmanlike conduct at the 2019 Queen's Club Championships.

Kyrgios was fined $113,000 for five separate incidents of unsportsmanlike conduct at the 2019 Cincinnati Masters tournament. During the second set, Kyrgios felt that the shot clock, which counts down the time allowed between points, had been started too early, and delivered an expletive-laden rant at umpire Fergus Murphy, saying Murphy was "the worst, hands down". He then walked off court, claiming he needed to use the restroom, but instead used the time to smash two racquets on the floor in a corridor. At the end of the match Kyrgios told Murphy he was "a fucking tool", did not shake his hand, made a vulgar gesture, and appeared to spit at him. The fine set an ATP record.

Kyrgios was fined $25,000 for unsportsmanlike conduct and an audible obscenity in his quarter-final match against Rafael Nadal at the 2022 Indian Wells Masters, in which Kyrgios had received a point penalty for swearing at a fan during the match, and had repeatedly clashed with the crowd and umpire Carlos Bernardes. At the 2022 Miami Open, Kyrgios was fined $47,000 for unsportsmanlike conduct during his loss to Jannik Sinner. Kyrgios had again clashed with Bernardes, who had given him a point penalty and then a game penalty during the match.

Kyrgios was fined $4,000 by the All England Club after his controversial match with Stefanos Tsitsipas in the third-round of the 2022 Wimbledon championships. According to one source, "the entire match was heated and had several high-tension moments". Kyrgios halted play after Tsitsipas hit a backhand into the crowd, possibly hitting a fan. Kyrgios stopped play for several minutes, yelling and swearing at the umpire, claiming he should have defaulted Tstisipas. Tsitsipas criticised Kyrgios at the press conference afterwards calling him a bully.

Kyrgios was fined $7,500 at the 2022 US Open, the biggest fine in the tournament's history, after yelling, and later spitting, at his player's box during his second round match against Benjamin Bonzi.

Mental health issues 
At age 19, ranked 144th in the world, he received a wildcard entry to play at Wimbledon and beat then-world No. 1 Nadal in the fourth round. Beating Nadal, the first time he played against him, brought international attention. From then on he was told: "you’re the next big thing in tennis." Kyrgios admits he didn’t know how to deal with the pressure. He told the Turn Up the Talk podcast in May this year: "I kept trying, trying and trying, just ended up snowballing into this dark cloud."

Things became so difficult for him that Kyrgios posted on Instagram that in 2018 he suffered from depression and engaged in self-harm and had suicidal ideation. In an interview on the Turn Up The Talk podcast,  he explained that in 2019, even when he was winning tournaments: “[I was] probably drinking 20 to 30 drinks every night – you know, just in my room on my own – waking up [and] playing." Kyrgios said that "winning tournaments seemed to ‘just mask all of it’, which was the ‘darkest thing ever’." Struggling to cope, he sought professional help and saw three or four different psychologists.

Endorsements

Kyrgios has endorsement deals with several companies, including Yonex, Nike and Beats. Bonds distanced itself from Kyrgios during his controversies of 2015. Malaysia Airlines ended their partnership after Kyrgios was suspended and fined for tanking in the 2016 Shanghai Rolex Masters.

Kyrgios is the founding contributor of the athlete direct publishing website PlayersVoice, and has also invested financially in the digital platform.

Personal life

Kyrgios is a Greek Orthodox Christian and wears a gold cross with three pendants – a cross, a tennis racquet and a piece of jade. His father wears a similar cross. 

Kyrgios is an avid fan of the Boston Celtics in the NBA and a life-long supporter of Tottenham Hotspur in English football's Premier League. Kyrgios also supports the North Melbourne Football Club in the Australian Football League., in January 2023, Kyrgios joined the ownership group of South East Melbourne Phoenix of the NBL.

Kyrgios has followed a vegan diet since at least early 2020. He said that seeing the loss of animal life during the intense bushfires across Australia reinforced his choice of diet.

Kyrgios has spoken about his battle with mental health, including depression and self-harm. He also admitted that in the past he abused drugs and alcohol.

Relationships
Kyrgios was previously in an on-again, off-again relationship with Croatian-Australian tennis player Ajla Tomljanović. In December 2021, Kyrgios started dating social-media influencer and interior designer Costeen Hatzi.

Common Assault Case 
In 2020, Kyrgios entered into a relationship with Chiara Passari, separating in late 2021 after police had to separate the two in a hotel quarantine argument. 

In 2022, it was announced that Kyrgios was summoned to appear in court, in Australia on 2 August 2022, to face a charge of common assault, for allegedly grabbing Passari in December 2021.

In 2023, Kyrgios pled guilty to the assault charge but was not convicted, as Magistrate Beth Campbell stated that he had "acted poorly in the heat of the moment," and that the case was "at the lower end of the scale of common assault."

Career statistics

Grand Slam tournament performance timelines

Singles
Current through the 2022 US Open.

Doubles

Grand Slam tournament finals

Singles: 1 (1 runner-up)

Doubles: 1 (1 title)

Notes

References

External links

 Official website
 
 
 
 
 Nick Kyrgios writes on PlayersVoice

1995 births
Living people
Australian male tennis players
Australian Open (tennis) junior champions
Australian people of Greek descent
Australian people of Malay descent
Australian people of Malaysian descent
Eastern Orthodox Christians from Australia
French Open junior champions
Hopman Cup competitors
Members of the Church of Greece
People educated at Daramalan College
Sportspeople from Canberra
Tennis people from the Australian Capital Territory
Grand Slam (tennis) champions in men's doubles
Wimbledon junior champions
Grand Slam (tennis) champions in boys' singles
Grand Slam (tennis) champions in boys' doubles